The Archdiocese of Seville is part of the Catholic Church in Seville, Spain. The Diocese of Seville was founded in the 3rd century. It was raised to the level of an archdiocese in the 4th century. The current archbishop is José Ángel Saiz Meneses. It has the suffragan dioceses of:

Cádiz y Ceuta
Córdoba
Huelva
Canaries
Jerez de la Frontera
San Cristóbal de La Laguna o Tenerife

Early History of the Diocese

During Roman times Seville was the capital of the Province of Baetica, and the origin of the diocese goes back to apostolic times, or at least to the 1st century. Saint Gerontius, Bishop of Italica, preached in Baetica, and without doubt must have left a pastor of its own to Seville. It is certain that in 303, when Saints Justa and Rufina were martyred for refusing to adore a pagan idol, there was a Bishop of Seville named Sabinus, who assisted at the Council of Illiberis in 287.

Zeno (472–486) was appointed vicar apostolic by Pope Simplicius, and Pope Hormisdas gave the same charge to Bishop Sallustius in the provinces of Baetica and Lusitania. However, the see was rendered illustrious above all by the holy brothers Saints Leander and Isidore. The former of these contributed to the conversion of Saint Hermengild and Recared, and presided at the Third Council of Toledo in 589. While the latter presided at the Fourth Council of Toledo and was the teacher of medieval Spain.

The king's son Philip was appointed Archbishop of Seville, while he was given as coadjutor the Dominican Raimundo de Losada, Bishop of Segovia, who became archbishop five years later, on the abdication of the Infante. In addition to the cathedral chapter, another community of clerics was formed to sing the Divine Office in the Chapel Royal of Our Lady of the Kings (Nuestra Senora de los Reyes) about 1252.

Most of the other mosques of the city were converted into churches, but Santa María la Blanca, Santa Cruz, and San Bartolome were left to the Jews for synagogues. The cathedral originated in the great mosque which was the work of the emirs who built the Aljama mosque, rebuilt in 1171 by the Almohad emir, Yusuf-ben Yacub. The famous tower called the Giralda is due to Almanzor. In order to secure the liturgical orientation, when the mosque was converted into a cathedral its width was made the length of the new church; and it was divided into two parts, the lesser part, on the cast, being separated from the rest by a balustrade and grating, to form the chapel royal.

List of Bishops and Archbishops of Seville

Early bishops

1300 to 1500

1500 to 1700

1700 to 1900

1900 to present 
Marcelo Spinola y Maestre (2 December 1895 – 20 January 1906) (Cardinal in 1905)
Salvador Castellote y Pinazo (6 December 1906 – 23 December 1906) 
Enrique Almaraz y Santos (18 April 1907 – 16 December 1920) (Cardinal in 1912), appointed Archbishop of Toledo
Eustaquio Ilundáin y Esteban (16 December 1920 – 10 August 1937) (Cardinal in 1925)
(Cardinal) Pedro Segura y Sáenz (14 September 1937 – 8 April 1957) 
José Bueno y Monreal (8 April 1957 – 22 May 1982) (Cardinal in 1958)
Carlos Amigo Vallejo (22 May 1982 – 5 November 2009) (Cardinal in 2003)
Juan Asenjo Pelegrina (5 November 2009 – 17 April 2021)
José Ángel Saiz Meneses (17 April 2021 – present)

Auxiliary bishops

References

External links 
Archidiócesis de Sevilla
Centro de Estudios Teológicos de Sevilla

Seville

Roman Catholic Ecclesiastical Province of Seville